The 2022 Minnesota United FC season is the club's sixth in Major League Soccer. Their season began on February 26, 2022, where they drew with the Philadelphia Union 1–1 in Philadelphia. The club will play its home matches at Allianz Field in Saint Paul, Minnesota. The club reached the MLS Cup Playoffs for a fourth consecutive year.

Technical Staff
As of April 16, 2022 

On June 23, the club announced that Head Coach Adrian Heath had signed a contract extension through the 2024 season. In addition, the club also announced that Assistant Coaches Ian Fuller and Sean McAuley and Goalkeeper Coach Stewart Kerr also signed contract extensions.

Roster
As of August 20th, 2022

Transfers

Transfers in

MLS SuperDraft

Transfers out

Loans in

Loans out

Friendlies

Competitions

MLS Regular Season

Standings

Overall

Western Conference

Results summary

Regular season

MLS Cup Playoffs

U.S. Open Cup

Statistics

Appearances and goals
Last updated October 17th 2022.

|-
! colspan="14" style="background:#21201E;color:#9BCEE3;border:1px solid #E1E2DD; text-align:center"|Goalkeepers

|-
! colspan="14" style="background:#21201E;color:#9BCEE3;border:1px solid #E1E2DD; text-align:center"|Defenders

|-
! colspan="14" style="background:#21201E;color:#9BCEE3;border:1px solid #E1E2DD; text-align:center"|Midfielders

|-
! colspan="14" style="background:#21201E;color:#9BCEE3;border:1px solid #E1E2DD; text-align:center"|Forwards

|-
! colspan="14" style="background:#21201E;color:#9BCEE3;border:1px solid #E1E2DD; text-align:center"| Player(s) transferred out but featured this season

|-
|}

Goalscorers

Assists

Disciplinary record

Clean sheets

Honors and awards

Bell Bank Man of the Match
 Note: Bell Bank Man of the Match is voted on by fans on Twitter near the end of each MLS Match. 

 Note: Bell Bank Man of the Match was not awarded after the game against Real Salt Lake on August 31 and San Jose Earthquakes on October 1st.

MLS Team of the Week

MLS Player of the Week

MLS All-Stars

References 

Minnesota United FC seasons
Minnesota United
Minnesota
Minnesota